Succession to the Liechtensteiner throne is governed by the house laws of the Princely Family of Liechtenstein, which stipulate agnatic primogeniture. In 2004, the head of state, Hans-Adam II, publicly responded to criticism from a committee of the UN which had voiced concerns about the exclusion of women from the line of succession, stating that the rule was older than the state itself.

Succession rules 

In 1606, the first prince of Liechtenstein, Karl I, and his younger brothers, Maximilian and Gundakar, signed Family Covenant, agreeing that the headship of the family should pass according to agnatic primogeniture to the heir of the most senior line. The family continued to be governed by various statutes until 1993, when it was decided that some of the provisions were outdated and that they should be amended. The statute was repealed on 26 October, and the new house law was published on 6 December. According to the house law, the right to succeed to the throne of Liechtenstein is reserved for male patrilineal descendants of Prince Johann I Joseph born to married parents, excluding issue born of marriage to which the sovereign did not consent. Should there be no more eligible male patrilineal descendants left, the sovereign has the right to adopt an heir presumptive. It is explicitly stated that if a member of the princely family adopts a prince who is in the line of succession, the adoptee's place in the line will not be altered. There is no scenario under which a woman could succeed to the throne of Liechtenstein. The house law also provides for a possibility of renunciation of succession rights.

Line of succession 

 Prince Johann I Josef (1760–1836)
 Prince Alois II (1796–1858)
 Prince Johann II (1840–1929)
 Prince Franz I (1853–1938)
 Prince Franz de Paula (1802–1887)
 Prince Alfred (1842–1907)
 Prince Alois (1869–1955)
 Prince Franz Josef II (1906–1989)
 Prince Hans-Adam II (born 1945)
 (1) Hereditary Prince Alois (b. 1968)
 (2) Prince Joseph Wenzel (b. 1995)
 (3) Prince Georg (b. 1999)
 (4) Prince Nikolaus (b. 2000)
 (5) Prince Maximilian (b. 1969)
 (6) Prince Alfons (b. 2001)
 (7) Prince Constantin (b. 1972)
 (8) Prince Moritz (b. 2003)
 (9) Prince Benedikt (b. 2008)
 (10) Prince Philipp (b. 1946)
 (11) Prince Alexander (b. 1972)
 (12) Prince Wenzeslaus (b. 1974)
 (13) Prince Rudolf (b. 1975)
 (14) Prince Karl Ludwig (b. 2016)
 (15) Prince Nikolaus (b. 1947)
 (16) Prince Josef-Emanuel (b. 1989)
 Prince Karl Alfred (1910–1985)
 (17) Prince Andreas (b. 1952)
 (18) Prince Gregor (b. 1954)
 Prince Georg Hartmann (1911–1998)
 (19) Prince Christoph (b. 1958)
  Prince Heinrich Hartneid (1920–1993)
 (20) Prince Hubertus (b. 1971)
 Prince Johannes (1873–1959)
 Prince Alfred (1907–1991)
 (21) Prince Franz (b. 1935)
 (22) Prince Alfred (b. 1972)
 (23) Prince Franz (b. 2009)
 (24) Prince Lukas (b. 1974)
 Prince Friedrich (1937–2010)
 (25) Prince Emanuel (b. 1978)
 (26) Prince Leopold (b. 2010)
 (27) Prince Heinrich (b. 2012)
 (28) Prince Ulrich (b. 1983)
 (29) Prince Anton (b. 1940)
 (30) Prince Georg (b. 1977)
  Prince Johannes (1910–1975)
 (31) Prince Eugen (b. 1939)
 (32) Prince Johannes (b. 1969)
 Prince Alfred Roman (1875–1930)
 Prince Hans-Moritz (1914–2004)
 (33) Prince Gundakar (b. 1949)
 (34) Prince Johann (b. 1993)
 (35) Prince Gabriel (b. 1998)
 (36) Prince Alfred (b. 1951)
 (37) Prince Karl (b. 1955)
 (38) Prince Hugo (b. 1964)
  Prince Heinrich (1916–1991)
 (39) Prince Michael (b. 1951)
 (40) Prince Christof (b. 1956)
 (41) Prince Karl (b. 1957)
  Prince Karl Aloys (1878–1955)
 (42) Prince Wolfgang (b. 1934)
 (43) Prince Leopold (b. 1978)
 (44) Prince Lorenz (b. 2012)
  Prince Eduard Franz (1809–1864)
  Prince Aloys (1840–1885)
  Prince Friedrich (1871–1959)
 Prince Aloys (1898–1943)
  Prince Luitpold (1940–2016)
 (45) Prince Carl (b. 1978)
  Prince Alfred (1900–1972)
  Prince Alexander (1929–2012)
 (46) Prince Christian (b. 1961)
 (47) Prince Augustinus (b. 1992)
 (48) Prince Johannes (b. 1995)
 (49) Prince Stefan (b. 1961)
 (50) Prince Lukas (b. 1990)
 (51) Prince Konrad (b. 1992)
 (52) Prince Emanuel (b. 1964)
 (53) Prince Josef (b. 1998)

Discrimination concerns 

In 2004, a United Nations committee questioned the compatibility of agnatic primogeniture, which prevents women from becoming head of state of Liechtenstein, with the International Covenant on Civil and Political Rights and later raised concern about it. In response to the United Nations' demands for gender equality in 2007, Prince Hans-Adam II explained that the succession law is older than the Principality of Liechtenstein itself and that it is a family tradition that does not affect the country's citizens; the Constitution of Liechtenstein stipulates that succession to the throne is a private family matter.

See also 

List of princes of Liechtenstein
List of heirs to the throne of Liechtenstein

References 

Liechtenstein
Line of succession
Line of succession
Women's rights in Liechtenstein